Sir Leonard Valentinovich Blavatnik (born June 14, 1957) is a Ukrainian-born American-British business magnate and philanthropist. As of March 2022, Forbes listed his wealth at $35.4 billion, making him somewhere between the 20th- and 33rd-richest person in the world. In 2017, Blavatnik received a knighthood for services to philanthropy.

Blavatnik made his initial fortune after the collapse of the Soviet Union in the privatization of state-owned aluminum and oil assets. He owns most of Warner Music Group and has stakes in several publicly traded assets via his privately held U.S. company Access Industries Holdings. He refers to himself as a self-made billionaire.

Early life and education
Blavatnik was born in 1957 in Odessa, then in the Ukrainian SSR and part of the Soviet Union, to a Jewish family. Blavatnik’s parents moved to Yaroslavl, a Russian city north of Moscow, when Blavatnik was a child. Blavatnik attended Moscow State University of Railway Engineering, but did not complete his coursework due to the family's request for emigration visas.

At Moscow State University of Railway Engineering, Blavatnik became close friends with Viktor Vekselberg, another Ukrainian Jew. Vekselberg would later go on to found Renova Group

His family emigrated from the Soviet Union to the United States of America in 1978, and he received a master's degree in computer science from Columbia University's School of Engineering and Applied Science in 1981 and an MBA from Harvard Business School in 1989.

Career

Access Industries Holdings
In 1986, Blavatnik founded the holding company, Access Industries Holdings, of which he is chairman and president. The New York-based business controls 21% of LyondellBasell, the world's largest producer of polypropylene. Through Access Industries Holdings Blavatnik owns most of Warner Music Group and has stakes in several publicly traded assets.

Natural Resources Sector
After the collapse of the Soviet Union, Blavatnik bought up former state assets in Russia that were privatized by the government. Blavatnik began his business career by accumulating shares in aluminum smelters in the period of privatisation that followed the collapse of the Soviet Union. He did this via his holding company, Access Industries. He has been described as a victor in Russia's "aluminum wars". Blavatnik made his wealth through the acquisition of these commodities.

One of his investments, Sual, later became part of United Company Rusal, the world's largest aluminium producer. Blavatnik was a board member of Rusal from 2007 to 2016.
The company also invested in regional electricity generating stations, which they used to supply power to their energy-intensive aluminium businesses. In a 2002 interview, Blavatnik told Bloomberg he was even considering creating his own railways. He and a friend from university, Viktor Vekselberg, formed the Renova investment vehicle.

Blavatnik and Vekselberg initially obtained a stake in the Irkutsk Aluminum Plant. They accumulated smelters and plants until their company Sual had become the second-largest aluminum firm in Russia. In 1996, they obtained a coal mine in Kazakhstan.

In 1997, Blavatnik Access Industries united with Viktor Vekselberg's Renova Corp and Mikhail Fridman's Alfa Group, to form a company AAR (Alfa, Access, Renova). Blavatnik’s key role within the group was to act as a connection to western businesses such as British Petroleum. Fridman, who was highly politically connected, had been a member of Boris Yeltsin’s inner circle in the mid 1990s.

The first order of business for AAR was to buy 40 per cent of a struggling oil producer Tyumen Oil (TNK) for $800 million. TNK was one of few remaining state-owned oil companies. Tyumen Oil was auctioned off with criteria that exactly matched AAR. AAR far outbid its competitors but did not end up buying the agreed sum. AAR reportedly paid just a quarter of the sum. TNK then went on an acquisition spree, alighting on the oil company Sidanco, which was part-owned by the U.K. oil giant, British Petroleum. In 1999, TNK acquired Sidanco's best assets via bankruptcy proceedings.

BP later sued TNK in the New York courts, claiming that the Sidanco assets were acquired illegally. The 1999 lawsuit was resolved in 2003 when British Petroleum acquired TNK, for $8 billion, forming TNK-BP, one of the largest oil companies in Russia. The deal, labelled in the press as "Russia's deal of the decade" gave BP unprecedented access to vital Russian oil and gas. It was the first time that a foreign company was in control of a major producer in Russia's energy heartland. The deal also made Len Blavatnik, Mikhail Fridman, German Khan and Viktor Vekselberg, who controlled half of TNK-BP, billions of dollars. 
 At the time, Fridman told the press: "Any business should be sold if you're offered the right price. If you don't, the market will punish you. Or God. Or maybe they are the same thing." At the time of the purchase, Blavatnik, a U.S. citizen, was living in New York.

In 2013, the Russian oil company Rosneft paid AAR $28 billion in cash for its 50% stake in TNK-BP. Their original investment was $8 billion of assets. Up to this point, AAR had taken $19 billion in dividends from the joint venture. The sale represented the liquidation of the majority of Blavatnik's Russian assets.

In 1999, Blavatnik sought to obtain the competing oil company Chernogorneft, which was being auctioned off. Blavatnik's TNK company obtained Chernogorneft at $180 million, even though the company had produced $1.2 billion worth of oil the year before.

Petrochemicals and oil
In August 2005, Access Industries bought petrochemicals and plastics manufacturer Basell Polyolefins from Royal Dutch Shell and BASF for $5.7 billion. On December 20, 2007, Basell completed its acquisition of the Lyondell Chemical Company for an enterprise value of approximately $19 billion. The resulting company, LyondellBasell Industries then became the world's eighth largest chemical company based on net sales. On January 6, 2009, the U.S. operations of LyondellBasell Industries filed for bankruptcy.

On April 30, 2010, LyondellBasell emerged from Chapter 11 bankruptcy protection in a significantly improved financial position. As part of its exit financing, LyondellBasell raised $3.25 billion of first priority debt as well as $2.8 billion through the rights offering jointly underwritten by Access Industries, Apollo Management, and Ares Management. LyondellBasell stock has increased 103% in value since April 2010. Access currently owns approximately 21% of LyondellBasell.

Claim Against JP Morgan Chase 
In 2010, Blavatnik sued JPMorgan Chase after losing $100 million by allegedly following Morgan's advice three years earlier to buy mortgage securities with AAA credit ratings. In 2013, the New York State Supreme Court ordered JPMorgan Chase to pay Blavatnik $50 million in damages.

At the time, Blavatnik told the New York Times: "The small guy can't get anywhere with suits like this. I am a wealthy man. I will spend whatever it takes."

Entertainment
In early 2010, Access Industries was reported as one of a handful of bidders for Metro-Goldwyn-Mayer.

On May 6, 2011, Warner Music Group announced its sale to Access for US$3.3 billion. On July 20, 2011, an Access affiliate acquired Warner Music Group for $3.3 billion. Though WMG was the World's third largest record company and considered a "trophy asset", it was also laden down with debt and struggling to find an answer to online music piracy. In May 2020, Warner Music announced it would proceed with an initial public offering that valued the company at $13.3 billion. The company listed on the Nasdaq stock exchange in June 2020. At which point, Blavatnik sold $1.9 billion of shares.

In 2012, Access Industries made €100 million investment in Deezer, the music streaming service.

In 2014, Access acquired Perform Group for £702 million. Its rivals included Germany's Sportsman Media Group and IMG of the U.S.

In 2016, Blavatnik launched Access Entertainment, which bought James Packer's stake in RatPac Entertainment and a 24.9% stake in Bad Wolf in 2017.

In 2017, Blatvatnik was named as possible purchaser of the publisher Time Inc. Blavatnik prepared the bid with Edgar "Ed" Bronfman Jr, the former chief executive of Warner Music. In March 2017, Bronfman and Blavatnik walked away from the deal, citing valuation issues.

In April 2018, it was reported that Blavatnik was a front runner in the bidding to purchase Britain's third oldest theatre, the Theatre Royal Haymarket. Sources reported that the bid was around £40 million. Blavatnik’s Access Entertainment finalized its purchase of the Theatre Royal Haymarket in June 2018.

Blavatnik also owns AI Film, the independent film and production company that backed Lee Daniels’ film The Butler and the summer 2015 release Mr. Holmes. He was an early investor in Rocket Internet and Beats Music, helped finance fashion designer Tory Burch, and, in 2013, paid $115 million for wireless spectrum in Norway.

Blavatnik has been the owner of DAZN Group since 2014, when Access Industries increased its stake in the company from 42.5% to 77%.

DAZN
DAZN (pronounced "da zone") has been described as the "Netflix of sports". The company is part of Perform Group, a U.K. based sports media company owned by Len Blavatnik's Access Industries.
 
DAZN specialise in buying rights to broadcast sports including football, boxing and Formula 1 motor racing, outside of their domestic markets. The sports streaming service is available in Japan, Germany and Canada. 

In May 2018, DAZN signed an eight year, $1 billion deal with Eddie Hearn's Matchroom Boxing to stream fights on a new U.S. subscription service.

In June 2018, DAZN paid €600 million for domestic screening rights for Italian Serie A football matches in a three-year deal. The deal was believed to involve 2.5 billion euros ($3 billion) of payments over its three-season lifespan

In October 2018, DAZN signed the largest commercial deal in history with a single athlete when they paid Mexican boxer Saul "Canelo" Alvarez $365 million for the rights to screen 11 fights.

DAZN's last set of published results, for the year to 2019, showed a loss of more than $1.3 billion for continuing and discontinued operations. The company, which is dependent on subscriptions, saw revenue take a hit when the COVID-19 pandemic brought an abrupt halt to live sports. Shortly after the outbreak of the pandemic, DAZN was forced to tell European football leagues that it would not pay for games that had been put on hold. Chief Executive Officer Simon Denyer explained: "With revenues dropping and investment not available, we can only survive by making some hard decisions."

In late 2020, DAZN unveiled a slate of original documentary programming featuring global sporting icons such as Ronaldo and British boxer Anthony Joshua.

In February 2022, Blavatnik agreed a $4.3 billion recapitalisation of DAZN. The Financial Times reported that this would enable the company to target new revenue streams in betting.

Telecommunications
Access Industries purchased the mobile phone technology company Acision from the IT Group Logica for £265 million in 2007. As of 2018, Access Industries owned 60% of Ice Group, Norway's third largest telecoms company.

Board membership
Blavatnik is a member of the Global Advisory Board of the Centre for International Business and Management at Cambridge University, a member of the board of Dean's Advisors at the Harvard Business School, a member of the Harvard Medical School Board of Fellows, and a member of the academic board at Tel Aviv University.

Philanthropy

Blavatnik, the Blavatnik Family Foundation and Access companies have supported many cultural and philanthropic institutions over the past 15 years, including serving as the primary benefactors for numerous major art and cultural exhibitions, including the British Museum, Tate Modern (which named a new wing the "Blavatnik Building" in 2017), Royal Opera House, National Portrait Gallery, the Courtauld, and Museum of Modern Art. Since 2007, the Blavatnik Family Foundation together with the New York Academy of Sciences has supported the Blavatnik Awards for Young Scientists. The annual award recognizes the accomplishments of outstanding young scientists in the U.S., the U.K., and Israel in the areas of life sciences, physical sciences and engineering and provides all finalists with a significant cash prize. In 2020, The Times newspaper described Blavatnik as "Britain's arts philanthropist-in-chief". Some critics characterize his donations as influence-buying and whitewashing.

Blavatnik sponsors a Colel Chabad  food bank and warehouse in Kiryat Malakhi, Israel, which sends monthly food shipments to 5,000 poor families in 25 Israeli cities, and before Jewish holidays to 30,000 families in 73 Israeli cities, towns and villages.

Blavatnik is also a financial supporter of Yale University, where he funded the Blavatnik Fund for Innovation at Yale, which supports early-stage biotechnology companies, as well as the Blavatnik Fellowship.

In 2010, it was announced that Blavatnik and the Blavatnik Family Foundation would donate £75 million to the University of Oxford to establish a new school of government. The gift is one of the largest philanthropic gifts in the university's 900-year history. Blavatnik also indicated the possibility of increasing his benefaction up to £100 million over time. The Blavatnik School of Government began accepting students in September 2012, and the new permanent home of the school was constructed on the Radcliffe Observatory Quarter. The building, which was finished in summer 2015, was designed by the Swiss architects Herzog & de Meuron. The first dean of the school is professor Ngaire Woods. At the time of the donation, Lord Patten, Chancellor of the University of Oxford, described it as "a once-in-a-century opportunity for Oxford."

In 2011, Blavatnik donated more than £50 million to the Tate Modern gallery in London – the largest donation in the gallery's history. In 2017, the gallery named their new £266 million extension building the Blavatnik Building.

In 2013, Harvard University announced a $50 million donation from Blavatnik's foundation to sponsor the establishment of the Blavatnik Biomedical Accelerator and encourage life sciences entrepreneurship at the university and named the first five HBS graduates to receive the Blavatnik Fellowship in Life Science Entrepreneurship. At the same time, Blavatnik also announced three $250,000 national prizes, in conjunction with the New York Academy of Sciences, for young scientists restricted to scientists under the age of 42. At the time, Blavatnik told the media: "The Nobel's about $1 million, I thought $250,000 was big enough to make it really interesting but not big enough to be scary. There are a lot of rewards for established scientists, but I don't think young scientists get enough encouragement and support in a systematic way."

In 2014, Blavatnik became a trustee of Carnegie Hall in New York City. In 2016, the Blavatnik family foundation made a $25 million gift to Carnegie Hall. In response, Carnegie Hall renamed its first level of boxes "The Blavatnik Family First Tier". The boxes will carry the Blavatnik name until 2066.

In 2016, Blavatnik funded a new hall at the Victoria and Albert Museum redevelopment.

In 2016, Blavatnik supported the $1.2 billion regeneration of rundown section of Miami's South Beach area into a centre for arts and culture. Blavatnik loaned the project an artwork by Damien Hirst titled "Gone But Not Forgotten". The work comprises a vitrine containing the gold-plated 10,000-year-old skeleton of a mammoth.

In 2018, Harvard Medical School announced a $200 million donation from Blavatnik's foundation to sponsor research, investments in data science, and the creation of subsidized lab space for biotech startups.

In 2018, Columbia's School of Engineering and Applied Science announced a gift from Blavatnik's foundation to fund engineering innovations in health. He also received the 2017 Samuel Johnson Medal from the school.

In June 2020, on the day of the Warner initial public offering, Access announced a $100 million fund to support "charitable causes related to the music industry, social justice and campaigns against violence and racism", supported by the Blavatnik family foundation.

In December 2020, Blavatnik made a donation of £10 million towards the renovation of the Courtauld Institute of Art.

In December 2021, Blavatnik donated half of the £15 million required to prevent the sale and dispersal of the Honresfield Library on the open market. The collection, originally created by Lancashire Industrialists William and Alfred Law, includes Brontë family manuscripts, Jane Austen letters, handwritten poems by Robert Burns.

In February 2022, Blavatnik made a multi-million pound contribution to the Imperial War Museum in London. The money will be used to establish the Blavatnik Art, Film and Photography Galleries.

Political donations
In 2011, Blavatnik donated to both President Barack Obama and his GOP rival, former Massachusetts governor Mitt Romney.

Blavatnik, who is closely associated with Russian oligarchs such as Viktor Vekselberg and Oleg Deripaska, is one of the largest donors to the US Republican Party, and in 2015–2016 donated a total of $7.35 million to six Republican political candidates, including South Carolina Senator Lindsey Graham, Florida Senator Marco Rubio and Arizona Senator John McCain. In February 2016, Blavatnik donated over $1 million to an anti-Donald Trump GOP group. He also donated $1 million to the committee for the inauguration of Donald Trump. In August 2017, political scientist Bo Rothstein resigned from the Blavatnik School of Government out of opposition to Blavatnik's politics.

Blavatnik and his American wife, Emily, also donated to Democratic Party candidates Kamala Harris, Chuck Schumer, and Hillary Clinton.

In 2017, after two senior Trump administration officials went on record as being lobbyists for Blavatnik's Access Industries, Blavatnik was mentioned in investigations led by Special Counsel Robert Mueller into Russian donations to the administration. Since April 2016, Blavatnik contributed $383,000 to the Republican National Committee and $1 million to Trump's inauguration fund; he also made a donation to Trump's legal fund. However, he did not give directly to the Trump campaign. Between 2015 and 2017, Blavatnik contributed $3.5 million to Republican Senate Leader Mitch McConnell's super PAC.

Blavatnik donated $5,200 to the Pete Buttigieg 2020 presidential campaign and $5,600 to the Joe Biden 2020 presidential campaign.

Personal life
Blavatnik is married to Emily Appelson Blavatnik. The couple have four children.

He owns a Grade II listed building on "the most expensive street in the world", Kensington Palace Gardens (number 15), which is valued at £200 million. He acquired the property in 2004. Other residents on the street include Israeli and Russian ambassadors. He also has a residence in Manhattan valued at more than $250 million.

Blavatnik is a friend of Israeli Prime Minister Benjamin Netanyahu and has donated to a private legal defense fund for Donald Trump.

Blavatnik is also a longtime friend and business partner of Ukrainian-born Russian oligarch Viktor Vekselberg, one of Russia's richest men, who is close to Russian President Vladimir Putin, and some other Russia-associated oligarchs being under Western sanctions for support of totalitarian regimes and criminal activities.

Blavatnik holds British and American citizenship.

Wealth 
In the Sunday Times Rich List 2015, Blavatnik was listed as the UK's richest person, with a fortune of £16.9 billion. Forbes ranks Blavatnik as the 59th richest in the world as of November 2019. As of 2019, Blavatnik was ranked 27th in the Forbes 400 list.

In May 2021, he once again topped the Sunday Times Rich List, having seen his wealth increase by £7.2 billion in the year to a total of £23 billion. In doing so, he replaced Sir James Dyson.

Honours 
In 2013, Blavatnik was made chevalier of the French Legion d'Honneur. He was knighted by Queen Elizabeth II in the 2017 Birthday Honours for services to philanthropy.

See also
Kensington Palace Gardens
Sunday Times Rich List 2017

Notes and references
Notes

References

External links
Len Blavatnik - Forbes profile
LyondellBasell Corporate Website
The New York Academy of Sciences' Blavatnik Awards for Young Scientists

1957 births
Living people
21st-century American Jews
American billionaires
American businesspeople in the coal industry
American businesspeople in the oil industry
American chemical industry businesspeople
American telecommunications industry businesspeople
American emigrants to England
American entertainment industry businesspeople
American financiers
American investors
American manufacturing businesspeople
American mass media owners
American mining businesspeople
American nonprofit businesspeople
American people of Russian-Jewish descent
American people of Ukrainian-Jewish descent
American real estate businesspeople
British billionaires
British businesspeople in the coal industry
British businesspeople in the oil industry
British entertainment industry businesspeople
British financiers
British investors
British mass media owners
British mining businesspeople
British people of Russian-Jewish descent
British people of Ukrainian-Jewish descent
British philanthropists
British real estate businesspeople
Businesspeople awarded knighthoods
Businesspeople from London
Businesspeople from Odesa
Chevaliers of the Légion d'honneur
Columbia School of Engineering and Applied Science alumni
Harvard Business School alumni
Harvard Medical School people
Jewish American philanthropists
Knights Bachelor
Moscow State University alumni
Naturalised citizens of the United Kingdom
People named in the Paradise Papers
People with acquired American citizenship
Russian billionaires
Russian businesspeople in the United Kingdom
Russian businesspeople in the United States
Russian Jews
Soviet emigrants to the United States
Soviet Jews
Tel Aviv University people
Ukrainian emigrants to the United Kingdom
Ukrainian Jews
20th-century American Jews
Philanthropists